Campanas Baixo is a settlement in the northern part of the island of Fogo, Cape Verde. It is situated 2 km east of São Jorge, 2 km southwest of Atalaia and 16 km northeast of the island capital São Filipe.

See also
List of villages and settlements in Cape Verde

References

Villages and settlements in Fogo, Cape Verde
São Filipe, Cape Verde